Cornelius Lyman (October 14, 1846 – June 16, 1926) was an American politician in the state of Washington. He served in the Washington House of Representatives from 1895 to 1897.

References

1846 births
1926 deaths
Republican Party members of the Washington House of Representatives
People from Farmington, Illinois
People from Dayton, Washington